Wauchope railway station is located on the North Coast line, in New South Wales, Australia. It serves the town of Wauchope, opening on 12 April 1915 when the line was extended from Taree. It was the terminus of the line until it was extended to Kempsey on 3 December 1917. The present station building was erected in 1990.

Platforms & services
Wauchope has one platform with a passing loop. Each day three northbound XPT services operate to Grafton, Casino and Brisbane, and three southbound services operate to Sydney. It is also served by a daily coach service to Port Macquarie.

References

External links
Wauchope station details Transport for New South Wales

Easy Access railway stations in New South Wales
Railway stations in Australia opened in 1915
Regional railway stations in New South Wales
Wauchope, New South Wales
North Coast railway line, New South Wales